Saïd Aït-Bahi (born 1984 in Rabat) is a Moroccan football player who currently blazes for French semi-professional club US Saint-Omer. Before moving to France, Aït-Bahi played for Moroccan clubs FUS Rabat and Ittihad Khemisset. In 2009, he joined FC Gueugnon and later had a spell with Nîmes Olympique. In June 2010, Aït-Bahi signed for Championnat National side US Créteil-Lusitanos. On 11 January 2012, it was announced that he had terminated his contract with Créteil in order to move elsewhere.

References

1984 births
Living people
Moroccan footballers
Footballers from Rabat
Nîmes Olympique players
FC Gueugnon players
US Créteil-Lusitanos players
Ligue 2 players
Ittihad Khemisset players
Association football defenders
US Saint-Omer players